Kimberly Warner-Cohen (born 1978) is an American novelist. She was born in Chicago and raised in Brooklyn, New York. Her first novel, Sex, Blood and Rock'n'Roll was put out by Ig Publishing in May 2006, and was a finalist in 2006/7 for Nerve.com's annual Henry Miller Award. The novel, about a female serial killer who derives sexual satisfaction out of the murders, is a harsh commentary on gender equality. Her short story, "People Are Strange", was included in Akashic Books' Portland Noir.

References

External links
Ig Publishing
Nerve.com's Henry Miller Awards

1978 births
Living people
American crime fiction writers
American women novelists
Women mystery writers
Writers from Chicago
21st-century American novelists
21st-century American women writers
Novelists from Illinois